Chao Pak Kei Football Team, simply known as C.P.K., are a Macanese professional football club which currently competes in the Liga de Elite.

History
Chao Pak Kei Football Team was established in 2008 by Stephen Chow, Inacio Hui and Kenneth Kwok. In 2009, C.P.K. played the Junior Division (the current 4th Division), finished at the second position and was promoted to the 3rd Division. In 2010, C.P.K. got the third position at 3rd Division and was promoted to the 2nd Division. After finished at 4th in 2011, C.P.K won the title of the 2nd Division in 2012 and was promoted to the 1st Division, also known as the Liga de Elite. In their debut year, the team got the 8th place, and in 2014, CPK got the 6th place of the Liga de Elite. In 2015, CPK reached the 3rd place of the Liga de Elite. In the season 2016, CPK got the 5th place at the Liga de Elite and the first-runner up at the Taça de Macau. In 2017, CPK got the 3rd place at the Liga de Elite and the fourth place at the Taça de Macau.

In 2018, CPK finished first runner-up of the Liga de Elite won the Taça de Macau.

On 28 June 2019, clinched the 2019 Liga de Elite title with a 4–0 victory over Ka I, capturing the league title for the first time in club history. As a result, Chao Pak Kei will play in the 2020 AFC Cup. Due to the inabilities of North Korean clubs to obtain AFC club licenses, Chao Pak Kei will enter the group stage directly.

Current squad
Squad for the 2022 Liga de Elite

Honours

League
Liga de Elite
 Champions (2): 2019, 2021, 2022
2ª Divisão de Macau
 Champions (1): 2012

Cup competitions
 Taça de Macau 
 Champions (3): 2018, 2021, 2022
 Runners-up (1): 2019

Continental Record

References

Football clubs in Macau